The 1988–89 Toshiba Rugby Union County Championship was the 89th edition of England's County Championship rugby union club competition.

Durham County won their eighth title after defeating Cornwall in the final.

The competition celebrated 100 years and despite the fact that it no longer held the same prestige as before a record crowd of 27,500 (the majority from Cornwall) turned up to watch the final at Twickenham Stadium.

Semi finals

Final

See also
 English rugby union system
 Rugby union in England

References

Rugby Union County Championship
County Championship (rugby union) seasons